Słowino  is a village in the administrative district of Gmina Darłowo, within Sławno County, West Pomeranian Voivodeship, in north-western Poland. It is located in the historic region of Pomerania.

The village has a population of 410.

References

Villages in Sławno County